Thimmasamudram is a village located in Naguluppala Padu Mandal of Prakasam district, Andhra Pradesh, India

References

Villages in Prakasam district